The European Academy of Art in Brittany (EESAB) is a French art school founded on December 27, 2010. It has four campuses: Brest, Lorient, Quimper et Rennes. With more than 800 students, it is the largest art school in France. On 1 April 2016, Danièle Yvergniaux was appointed general director of the school. She had been the director at Quimper since 2006. The school is accredited by the accredited by the French Ministry of Culture  to grant the National Diploma in Art and the  National Higher Diploma in Visual Expression

References

External links 
 EESAB website (English)

Art schools in France